Edward Benjamin Rothstein (born October 16, 1952) is an American critic.  Rothstein wrote music criticism early in his career, but is best known for his critical analysis of museums and museum exhibitions.

Rothstein holds a B.A. from Yale University (1973), an M.A. in English literature from Columbia University, and a Ph.D. from the Committee on Social Thought at the University of Chicago (1994). In addition, Rothstein did graduate work in mathematics at Brandeis University. He was at The New York Times for a long time, but he took a buyout (a cash payout offered to employees, with compensation based on a sliding scale of the number of years they spent working for the employer) from the newspaper and joined The Wall Street Journal. He wrote in 2020 that "At The New York Times, freedom of speech gave way to group pressure, and debate turned into intimidation.".

Rothstein was the cultural critic-at-large for The New York Times, particularly examining the reach and depth of museums, large and small, one by one. He has worked as a music critic for The New Republic and as the chief music critic for the Times.
Rothstein is a two-time winner of the ASCAP Deems Taylor Award for music criticism, and was given a Guggenheim Fellowship in 1991.

Writings
 Archive of Rothstein's The Wall Street Journal articles
 Archive of Rothstein's  The New York Times articles
 Archive of Rothstein's tech columns in The New York Times
 "Mozart: In Search of the Roots of Genius", Smithsonian, February, 2006.
 "Contemplating Churchill", Smithsonian, March, 2005.
 Visions of Utopia (New York Public Library Lectures in Humanities), with Herbert Muschamp and Martin E. Marty  (Oxford University Press, 2004) .
 1998 Diary in Slate
 Emblems of Mind: The Inner Life of Music and Mathematics (Times Books, 1995).
 Foreword to Arthur Loesser's Men, Women and Pianos: A Social History (1991).
 Archive of Rothstein's essays 1979-90 in The New York Review of Books

References

External links 
 

American music critics
Classical music critics
Living people
1952 births
Place of birth missing (living people)
Yale University alumni
Columbia University alumni
University of Chicago alumni
Brandeis University alumni